Mr. Superinvisible (also known as Mr. Invisible and The Unseizable Invincible Mr. Invisible) is a 1970 Italian fantasy-comedy film directed by Antonio Margheriti. It was released in the United States as the first film of the K-Tel company.

Cast 
Dean Jones as Peter Denwell
Gastone Moschin as Koko
Ingeborg Schöner as  Irene
Peter Carsten as Pomerantz
Alan Collins as Raimondo
Roberto Camardiel as Beithel 
Giacomo Furia
Liana Del Balzo
Luigi Bonos

Reception
In a contemporary review, the Monthly Film Bulletin stated that the film adds little innovation already done by films such as The Invisible Man (1933).
The review noted "flaccid direction" and an "uninventive" script. The film did praise the special effects as "competently handled" while "tiresome dubbing detracts from hardworking performances"

References

External links

1970 films
1970s fantasy comedy films
1970s Italian-language films
Films directed by Antonio Margheriti
Films scored by Carlo Savina
Italian fantasy comedy films
1970 independent films
Italian independent films
Films about invisibility
1970 comedy films
1970s Italian films